A Letter to the President is a 2017 Afghan drama film directed by Roya Sadat. It was selected as the Afghan entry for the Best Foreign Language Film at the 90th Academy Awards, but it was not nominated.

Plot
Soraya, a low-level government official, is imprisoned when she defends a woman from village lords. Behind bars, she writes the Afghan President for help.

Cast
 Leena Alam as Soraya
 Aziz Deldar as Behzad

See also
 List of submissions to the 90th Academy Awards for Best Foreign Language Film
 List of Afghan submissions for the Academy Award for Best Foreign Language Film

References

External links
 

2017 films
2017 drama films
Dari-language films
Afghan drama films